The "Streatham" portrait is an oil painting on panel from the 1590s believed to be a later copy of a woodcut of the English noblewoman Lady Jane Grey from 1580. It shows a three-quarter-length depiction of a young woman in Tudor-period dress holding a prayer book, with the faded inscription "Lady Jayne" or "Lady Iayne" in the upper-left corner. It is in poor condition and damaged, as if it has been attacked.  the portrait is in Room 3 of the National Portrait Gallery in London.

The work is thought to have been completed as part of a set of paintings of Protestant martyrs. It was in the possession of a collector in Streatham, London, by the early 20th century. In December 2005 the portrait was examined by the art dealer Christopher Foley. He saw it as an accurate, though poorly executed, reproduction of a contemporary painting of Jane, had it verified and on that basis negotiated its sale. The work was acquired by the National Portrait Gallery in London for a rumoured £100,000. The historian David Starkey was highly critical of the sale and challenged Foley's identifications.

Background

Lady Jane Grey was the great-granddaughter of King Henry VII through his youngest daughter, Mary, and first cousin once removed of King Edward VI. After Edward's death, a Protestant faction proclaimed her queen over his Catholic half-sister, Mary. Two weeks later, Mary, with the support of the English people, claimed the throne, which Jane relinquished only nine days after being installed. Jane and her husband, Lord Guildford Dudley, were imprisoned in the Tower of London on charges of high treason. Jane's trial was conducted in November, but her sentence of death was suspended. In February 1554, Jane's father, the Duke of Suffolk, who had been pardoned, participated in Wyatt's rebellion. On 12 February, Mary had Jane, then aged 16, and her husband beheaded; Jane's father suffered the same fate two days later.

Jane was a devout Protestant during the English Reformation, when the Church of England violently rejected the authority of the pope and the Roman Catholic Church. Known for her piety and education, she corresponded with Protestant leaders in Continental Europe, such as Heinrich Bullinger. A modest person who dressed plainly, her last words before her execution are reported as "Lord, into thy hands I commend my spirit!" Jane's execution by a Catholic queen made her into what the Oxford Dictionary of National Biography terms a "Protestant martyr", and by the end of the century Jane had become, in the words of the historian Eric Ives, "a Protestant icon". Depictions of Jane in the 16th and 17th centuries, such as in John Foxe's Actes and Monuments (1563), published after Protestant Elizabeth I took the throne, "presented [Jane] as primarily a figure in a national narrative about an elect nation possessed of a pure Protestant faith which had risen supreme over Catholic Europe".

Jane was long thought to be the only 16th-century English monarch without a surviving contemporary portrait; one was documented in a 1590 inventory, but is now considered lost. Some identified as her were later deemed to be of other sitters, such as one of Catherine Parr, the last of the six wives of Henry VIII, which was identified as Lady Jane Grey until 1996. Other works, such as The Execution of Lady Jane Grey (1833) by Paul Delaroche, were painted years or centuries after her death. As a result, Cynthia Zarin of The New Yorker writes, "the blank where [Jane's] face should be has made it that much easier for succeeding generations to imprint their political and personal fantasies on her".

Description

The three-quarter-length portrait measures 85.6 cm × 60.3 cm (33.7 in × 23.7 in), and is painted with oil on Baltic oak. A faded inscription, reading "Lady Jayne" or "Lady Iayne", is in the upper-left corner, above the woman's shoulders. The sitter is described by art critic Charlotte Higgins as a slender and "demure, pious young woman", and has been tentatively identified as Lady Jane Grey. Ives notes a familial resemblance between the sitter and Grey's sisters, Catherine and Mary, which "may give conjectural support" to the identification of Grey.

The subject wears an opulent red gown with turned-back trumpet sleeves and a partlet with standing collar; the latter is embroidered with a fleur-de-lis pattern, the heraldic emblem of French royalty. The design on her  underskirt shows a pattern variously identified as strawberries, gilliflowers, Scots thistles or pinks; the last of these was an emblem of the Grey family. A French hood on her head covers most of her red hair. She wears numerous pieces of jewellery, including a necklace finished with medallions and pearls; these indicate a person of high social and economic status, which is reinforced by the silk and velvet of her gown. The sitter is not, however, wearing a wedding ring, suggesting she was not yet married. Instead she is holding a prayer book. This type of costume was popular during the Tudor period, particularly in the 1550s, and the accuracy of its depiction has been used to advance the portrait's authenticity as a depiction of Jane Grey.

The independent historian J. Stephan Edwards writes, however, that the fleur-de-lis give him pause as, before June 1553, Jane "would have had no right to the French heraldic emblems" as she was not yet an heir to the throne. After the discovery of an inscribed portrait of Catherine Parr, in 2014 Edwards published a tentative identification of said painting as the original on which the Streatham portrait was based. He wrote that the Parr painting had been "adapted to 'become' Jane Grey in the absence of an accessible authentic portrait" in the Streatham portrait and similar, supporting this with an analysis of the similar styles of dress and the jewellery (including a necklace of festooned pearls).

Reception of the painting as a work of art has been predominantly negative. The historian David Starkey described it as "an appallingly bad picture and there's absolutely no reason to suppose it's got anything to do with Lady Jane Grey", a sentiment which the art dealer Christopher Foley rejected. Tarnya Cooper of the National Portrait Gallery gave less sharp criticism, stating "it's a paint-by-number, labored copy", and "its value is as a historical document rather than a work of art". Zarin describes the painting as looking bleached in comparison with other portraits of monarchs, with "the flat face of a paper doll". Edwards writes "the quality might be described as naive, primitive, or even folk art".

History

Production and early history

The portrait is undated and unattributed. It is thought to have been completed in the 1590s, some forty years after Jane's death, probably as a copy of a 1580 woodcut of Jane, dendrochronology dates the wood panel to  1593.

Another strikingly similar portrait, depicting a woman also credited as Jane – although the costume differs slightly – was once owned by Richard Monckton Milnes, 1st Baron Houghton, but is now in an undisclosed private collection. Christopher Foley traced this painting back to Francis Rodes of Barlborough Hall.The Rodeses owned an entire collection of portraits of Protestant heroes. Owing to similarities between the two works, Edwards suggests they are both copies of a lost original, perhaps completed by the same studio. A third copy, once owned by the English costume designer Herbert Norris, the Norris Portrait, is known through records, although its whereabouts are unknown. 

The Streatham portrait may too have been part of a collection of Protestant martyr paintings. Damage to the painting's mouth and eyes suggests that it was vandalised, possibly by a Catholic partisan; as the seventeen scratches did not splinter the paint, this attack was probably not long after the portrait's completion. Owing to the painting's crudeness, Foley suggests that it was hurriedly completed for Jane's family from an original that "had to be destroyed because it would have been too dangerous to own once Mary became queen".

Discovery
The portrait was in the possession of a family in Streatham, London, by the 20th century. They had long believed the portrait was of Jane, and since 1923 had tried to convince others of its authenticity, without success. It was passed from generation to generation. In December 2005, Sir John Guinness informed Foley of the family and their portrait. Foley visited the owner, hoping "to go shut the fellow up", but upon seeing the work on an easel in their attic "knew it was right" for the period.

The identity of the sitter has been debated since the panel's discovery. Foley has identified at least four Jane Greys among the English nobility at the time of the portrait. However, owing to "the ages and marital status of the other candidates", Lady Jane Grey was the only viable choice; the others were too young, already married and using a different surname, or had lost their title. Starkey was more reserved, arguing "there isn't that over-the-top quality you get with royal portraits of the period, where the sitters look as though they've just come back from Asprey", and that there was no documentation of Jane owning the jewellery seen in the portrait.

After the discovery, Libby Sheldon of University College London conducted several tests to verify the painting's age, including spectroscopy and laser microscopy. The age of the inscription was taken into consideration, and found to be contemporaneous with the rest of the painting. Pigments, including a type of yellow pigment rarely found after 1600, were appropriate for the 16th century. Dendrochronological analysis later showed that the work was too late to be a life portrait of Jane, but did not rule out the possibility of reproduction.

National Portrait Gallery

The painting was purchased in 2006 by the National Portrait Gallery, London, with funds raised through their 150th anniversary gala, after more than nine months' consideration. The cost was rumoured to be more than £100,000, though Zarin gives a price of £95,000. The acquisition was criticised by Starkey, who said, "if the National Portrait Gallery has public money to burn, then so be it ... [the decision] depends on mere hearsay and tradition, and it is not good enough". Foley countered, "The evidence has been supported by people who know far more about the science of painting than David Starkey. I don't know what his problem is – is it because he didn't find it?"

Privately Starkey acted on behalf of the Philip Mould Gallery and examined another portrait thought to be Jane, held by the Yale Center for British Art. This  miniature had been identified as Elizabeth I during a 1983 exhibition at the Victoria and Albert Museum; Starkey, however, was "90 per cent certain" it depicted Jane. After the March 2007 exhibition Lost Faces, when the miniature was displayed after a recent resurgence of interest in Jane, Foley published a lengthy letter challenging Starkey's judgement. He cited the sitter's brooch and emblem as indicative that she was not Jane Grey.

The Streatham portrait bears the accession number of NPG 6804 and is considered part of the gallery's primary collection. From January 2007 until early 2010 it was displayed in the Tudor Gallery. Beginning in early 2013, the painting was hung in Room 2 of the gallery's regional outpost at Montacute House in Somerset, part of an exhibition of Tudor-era portraits.

See also

Streatham Worthies, a circle of literary and cultural figures from Streatham commemorated by a series of portraits by Joshua Reynolds

Notes

References

Works cited

  

 

1590s paintings
2005 archaeological discoveries
Paintings in the National Portrait Gallery, London
English paintings
Lady Jane Grey
Portraits of monarchs
Books in art
Portraits of women